The 1909 Wimbledon Championships took place on the outdoor grass courts at the All England Lawn Tennis and Croquet Club in Wimbledon, London, United Kingdom. The tournament ran from 21 June until 3 July. It was the 33rd staging of the Wimbledon Championships, and the first Grand Slam tennis event of 1909.

This was the final Wimbledon tournament during the reign of King Edward VII.

Champions

Men's singles

 Arthur Gore defeated  Major Ritchie  6–8, 1–6, 6–2, 6–2, 6–2

Women's singles

 Dora Boothby defeated  Agnes Morton  6–4, 4–6, 8–6

Men's doubles

 Herbert Roper Barrett /  Arthur Gore defeated  Stanley Doust /  Harry Parker, 6–2, 6–1, 6–4

References

External links
 Official Wimbledon Championships website

 
Wimbledon Championships
Wimbledon Championships
Wimbledon Championships
Wimbledon Championships